This is a list of the 326 members of the 12th legislature of the Italian Senate that were elected in the 1994 general election. The legislature met from 15 April 1994 to 8 May 1996.

Senators for life are marked with a "(L)"

Alliance of Progressives

Democratic Party of the Left

Social Christians
Michele Corvino
Piepaolo Casadei Monti
Guido Cesare De Guidi
Enrica Pietra Lenzi
Giovanni Russo
Cosimo Scaglioso

Labour Federation
Paolo Bagnoli
Antonino Valletta

Lega Nord

National Alliance

Forza Italia

Italian People's Party

Communist Refoundation Party

Progressists - Greens - The Net

Federalist Greens
Francesco Carella
Enrico Falqui
Giovanni Lubrano Di Ricco
Luigi Manconi
Maurizio Pieroni
Carla Rocchi
Edo Ronchi

Movement for Democracy - The Net
Anna Maria Abramonte
Giovanni Campo
Pietro Cangelosi
Francesco De Notaris
Bruno Di Maio
Carmine Mancuso

Christian Democratic Centre
Antonio Belloni
Claudio Bonansea
Giuseppe Brienza
Alfonso Capone
Giuseppe Fronzuti
Giovanni Gei
Vincenzo La Russa
Carmine Mensorio
Giovanni Mongiello
Roberto Napoli
Massimo Palombi
Luigi Pepe

Italian Socialist Party
Orietta Baldelli
Francesco Barra
Francesco De Martino (L)
Gianni Fardin
Carlo Gubbini
Maria Rosaria Manieri
Cesare Marini
Maria Antonia Modolo
Michele Sellitti
Antonio Vozzi

Mixed group

South Tyrolean People's Party
Karl Ferrari
Roland Riz
Helga Thaler Ausserhofer

Independents

References

Lists of political office-holders in Italy
Lists of legislators by term
Lists of members of upper houses